The Green Party of British Columbia held an election between September 5 and 13, 2020, to elect a leader to replace Andrew Weaver, who resigned on January 6, 2020, due to a personal health issue. Adam Olsen was made interim leader shortly after Weaver's resignation. Party members cast votes online and by telephone, using ranked ballots. Members and supporters 16 years of age and older were eligible to vote.

On March 27, 2020, the election was postponed indefinitely due to the COVID-19 pandemic and the resultant state of emergency in the province. Before the postponement, voting was to take place between June 15 and 26. The deadline to enter the race was to be April 15, and debates were planned to take place after April 30, in three regions of the province. The winner was to be announced at the party's convention in Nanaimo from June 26 to 28 that year.

The campaign resumed on June 15, 2020. The party opened a second nomination period which ran from June 26 to July 27. Members and supporters had until August 21 to register in order to be able to vote by phone, and until September 2 to be able to vote online. A debate took place on September 1. Voting occurred from September 5 to 13. On September 14, 2020, it was announced that Sonia Furstenau had won the contest. Turnout among eligible voters was 85%.

Timeline

2019
October 7 – Andrew Weaver announces he will step down as party leader once a new leader is chosen.
December 20 – Adam Olsen is named interim leader.

2020
January 6 – The party releases the leadership contest rules.
January 13 – Leadership contest officially begins.
January 27 – Deputy Leader Sonia Furstenau announces her candidacy.
March 4 – Kim Darwin announces her candidacy.
March 27 – The election is postponed indefinitely due to the COVID-19 pandemic.
April 15 – Original deadline for candidates to enter race. The deadline was subsequently changed to July 27 following postponement of the race.
June 15 – The leadership race is officially re-opened following the postponement.
July 25 – Cam Brewer announces his candidacy.
July 27 – Deadline for candidates to apply.
August 21 – Deadline to become a member or supporter if voting by phone.
September 1 – Official leadership debate.
September 2 – Deadline to become a member or supporter if online voting.
September 5 – Voting period begins.
September 13 – Voting period ends.
September 14 – Leader announced.

Results

Debates

Candidates

Cam Brewer

Cam Brewer is a Vancouver lawyer and Simon Fraser University adjunct professor who practices environmental and Aboriginal law.

Candidacy announced: July 25, 2020
Date registered with Elections BC:
Campaign website:

Kim Darwin

Kim Darwin is an independent mortgage consultant and former president of the Sechelt Chamber of Commerce. She served as vice chair of the Green Party of British Columbia's provincial council and stood as a candidate for Powell River-Sunshine Coast in 2017.

Candidacy announced: March 4, 2020
Date registered with Elections BC:
Campaign website:

Sonia Furstenau

Sonia Furstenau, 49, is the MLA for Cowichan Valley (2017–present) and deputy leader of the party (2016–present).

Candidacy announced: January 27, 2020
Date registered with Elections BC:
Campaign website:

Declined
Jonina Campbell – deputy leader (2018–present), candidate for New Westminster in 2017.
Adriane Carr – Vancouver city councillor (2011–present), former deputy leader of the Green Party of Canada (2006–2014), former leader of the Green Party of British Columbia (2000–2005, 1983–1985).
Pete Fry – Vancouver city councillor (2018–present), candidate for Vancouver-Mount Pleasant in 2016 by-election.
Lisa Helps – Mayor of Victoria (2014–present). Endorsed Furstenau.
Joe Keithley – Burnaby city councillor (2018–present), candidate for Burnaby-Lougheed in 2017.
Racelle Kooy – Green Party of Canada candidate for Victoria in 2019.
Adam Olsen – MLA for Saanich North and the Islands (2017–present), former interim leader (2013–2015). Became interim leader.
Dana Taylor – former North Vancouver councillor, candidate for West Vancouver-Sea to Sky in 2017, Green Party of Canada candidate for West Vancouver—Sunshine Coast—Sea to Sky Country in 2019.		
Michael Wiebe – Vancouver city councillor (2018–present), former commissioner of the Vancouver Park Board (2014–2018).

See also
 2020 Green Party of Canada leadership election

Notes

References

External links
 Green Party of British Columbia's official page for the 2020 leadership contest

Green Party of British Columbia leadership election
Leadership election, 2020
Green, 2020
Green Party of British Columbia leadership election, 2020
Green Party of British Columbia leadership election